The following lists the top 25 singles of 2009  in Australia from the Australian Recording Industry Association (ARIA) End of Year singles chart.

"I Gotta Feeling" by The Black Eyed Peas was the biggest song of the year, peaking at #1 for 7 weeks and staying in the Top 50 (so far) for 30 weeks. The longest stay at #1 was "TiK ToK" by Kesha which spent 8 weeks at #1.

Notes

References

Australian record charts
2009 in Australian music
Australia Top 25 Singles